The District is a film and television company started in 2014 by film director Ruben Fleischer and former Rip Cord Productions employee David Bernad.

History 
The District was started on June 24, 2014 by film director Ruben Fleischer and Rip Cord Productions employee David Bernard, and it will kick off with a two-year overall deal at Universal Television, allowing it to produce comedies and dramas.

The studio's first production, Superstore, was picked up to series by NBC on May 7, 2015. It eventually become a hit series. Its next project was The Bold Type, which was picked up by Freeform on January 10, 2017.

Productions

Film

Television

References

External links 

 The District at IMDb

Entertainment companies based in California
Film production companies of the United States
Television production companies of the United States
Entertainment companies established in 2014
Companies based in Los Angeles
2014 establishments in California